Thomas V. LaFauci (October 18, 1918 – July 16, 2002) was an American politician who served in the New York State Assembly from 1952 to 1967.

References

1918 births
2002 deaths
Democratic Party members of the New York State Assembly
20th-century American politicians